The Military ranks of Namibia are the military insignia used by the Namibian Defence Force.

Commissioned officer ranks
The rank insignia of commissioned officers.

Other ranks
The rank insignia of non-commissioned officers and enlisted personnel.

See also
 List of Namibian Generals
 List of Namibian admirals
 List of Namibian Air Officers

References

External links
 
 

Namibia
Military of Namibia
Namibia and the Commonwealth of Nations